Gérard "Gé" Bohlander  (5 November 1895 – 18 December 1940) was a Dutch male water polo player. He was a member of the Netherlands men's national water polo team. He competed with the team at the 1920 Summer Olympics and 1924 Summer Olympics.

His brother, Willy Bohlander, was also a water polo player and competed for the national team also at the 1924 Summer Olympics.

Bohlander died in December 1940 due to the complications after a car accident.

References

External links
 

1895 births
1940 deaths
Dutch male water polo players
Water polo players at the 1920 Summer Olympics
Water polo players at the 1924 Summer Olympics
Olympic water polo players of the Netherlands
Water polo players from Amsterdam
Road incident deaths in the Netherlands
20th-century Dutch people